Judah ben Solomon ha-Kohen (ibn Matkah) (1215– 1274) was a thirteenth-century Spanish Jewish philosopher, astronomer, and mathematician. He was the author of the Midrash ha-Ḥokmah, considered the first of the great Hebrew encyclopedias, and notable for its in-depth treatment both of the exact sciences and of biblical and rabbinic texts.

Judah ben Solomon was born and educated in Toledo, the grandson of prominent rabbi Ziza ibn Shushan. He was a pupil of Meir Abulafia, who induced him to study philosophy and Jewish mysticism.

At the age of eighteen he entered into correspondence with the philosophers at the court of Emperor Frederick II. The emperor himself consulted him about scientific matters, and his answers proved so satisfactory that he was invited in 1247 to settle in Tuscany, where he had free access to the imperial court. There he translated into Hebrew his major work, an encyclopedia entitled Midrash ha-Ḥokmah, which he had originally written in Arabic.

Midrash ha-Ḥokmah is divided into two parts. The first provides a survey of Aristotelian logic, physics, and metaphysics, and contains, besides, a treatise on certain passages in Genesis, Psalms, and Proverbs. The second part is devoted to mathematics, and contains, also, two treatises: the first, a mystical one on the letters of the alphabet; the other, a collection of Biblical passages to be interpreted philosophically. It also includes adaptation of Ptolemy's Almagest, which he arranged in eight chapters, and of his Quadripartitum under the Hebrew title Mishpeṭe ha-Kokabim, a treatise on astrology, and an adaptation of Al-Bitruji's astronomy, under the title Miklal Yofi.

Notes

References

 

1215 births
1274 deaths
People from Toledo, Spain
13th-century mathematicians
13th-century Jews from al-Andalus
Jewish encyclopedists
Kohanim writers of Rabbinic literature
Medieval Jewish philosophers
Medieval Jewish astronomers